Masoli may refer to
Jeremiah Masoli (born 1988), American football quarterback
Masoli River in Maharashtra, India
Masoli Dam on Masoli River